A dark horse is a previously lesser-known person or thing that emerges to prominence in a situation, especially in a competition involving multiple rivals, or a contestant that on paper should be unlikely to succeed but yet still might.

Origin
The term began as horse racing parlance for a race horse that is unknown to gamblers and thus difficult to establish betting odds for.

The first known mention of the concept is in Benjamin Disraeli's novel The Young Duke (1831). Disraeli's protagonist, the Duke of St. James, attends a horse race with a surprise finish: "A dark horse which had never been thought of, and which the careless St. James had never even observed in the list, rushed past the grandstand in sweeping triumph."

Politics
The concept has been used in political contexts in such countries as Iran, Philippines, Russia, Egypt, Finland, Canada, the United Kingdom, and the United States.

Politically, the concept came to the United States in the nineteenth century when it was first applied to James K. Polk, a relatively unknown Tennessee politician who won the Democratic Party's 1844 presidential nomination over a host of better-known candidates. Polk won the nomination on the ninth ballot at his party's national nominating convention, and went on to become the country's eleventh president.

Other successful dark horse candidates for the United States presidency include:
 Franklin Pierce, chosen as the Democratic nominee and later elected the fourteenth president in 1852.
 Abraham Lincoln, chosen as the Republican nominee and elected as the sixteenth president in 1860.
 Rutherford B. Hayes, elected the nineteenth president in 1876.
 James A. Garfield, elected the twentieth president in 1880.
 Warren G. Harding, Senator from Ohio, elected the twenty-ninth president in 1920 after his surprise nomination.
Harry S. Truman, Vice-President and former Senator from Missouri and thirty-third president, was virtually unknown to the American people when he succeeded President Franklin D. Roosevelt in 1945. Truman was considered a lame duck President with no chance of winning against Republican nominee and New York Governor Thomas E. Dewey, yet managed to shock the world by emerging victorious in the 1948 United States presidential election – widely considered one of the biggest upsets in American history.
 Jimmy Carter, former Governor of Georgia elected the thirty-ninth president in 1976; in the beginning of that same year, Carter was relatively unknown outside his home state of Georgia but went on to win the nomination over rivals with more national prominence. At the 1976 Democratic National Convention Carter made a joke of his obscurity beginning his speech saying "My name is Jimmy Carter, and I'm running for President." 
Barack Obama, the Junior Senator from Illinois, who had captivated the Democratic Convention on behalf of John Kerry in 2004,  was still relatively unknown to the American people when he entered into the 2008 Democratic Party presidential primaries but emerged from obscurity to narrowly edge out the heavily favored Hillary Clinton for the nomination. Obama would be elected president, becoming the nation's first African-American president. 
Donald Trump, a real estate investor and reality television personality, defeated 15 established rivals for the Republican nomination before defeating former Secretary of State Hillary Clinton in the general election despite losing the popular vote by over 2.8 million votes. Trump had never held political office prior to his presidency, but had been running or espousing to run for president since 1999.

Perhaps the two most famous unsuccessful dark horse presidential candidates in American history are Democrat William Jennings Bryan, a three-term congressman from Nebraska nominated on the fifth ballot after impressing the 1896 Democratic National Convention with his famous Cross of Gold speech (Bryan would go on to receive the Democratic presidential nomination twice more and serve as United States Secretary of State), and Republican businessman Wendell Willkie, who was nominated on the sixth ballot at the 1940 Republican National Convention despite never having previously held government office and having only joined the party in 1939. U.S. Senator Bernie Sanders is another classic example of a dark horse candidate, whose grassroots campaign in the 2016 Democratic Party presidential primaries came much closer than initially expected to toppling front-runner Hillary Clinton for the party's presidential nomination. 

Outside of the United States, the dark horse status also attributed to:
 in Peru Alberto Fujimori rose to the presidency in 1990, after being mostly unknown during the electoral race and eventually defeating his rival Mario Vargas Llosa, who initially was leading the polls. This same feat would be repeated in the 2021 Peruvian general election, when Pedro Castillo, a previously unknown elementary school teacher, won the presidential race in the first round and eventually in the Runoff.
 In Nigeria, Goodluck Jonathan can be referred to as a dark horse, as he was the first president from the historically marginalized Niger Delta region, and he also rose through three political offices (from the deputy governor of Bayelsa State to governor, from governor to vice-president, and from vice-president to president) through unusual circumstances. 
 In Finland, Lauri Kristian Relander was elected president as a dark horse in 1925, his party naming him as its candidate only after the people had voted for presidential electors. A dark horse presidency in Finland remained possible and sometimes speculated upon until the electoral system was changed to a direct personal vote in 1987.
 Several government ministers, who were appointed to the third cabinet of Russian prime minister Dimitri Medvedev on 21 May 2012, were also described as "dark horses" for lacking experience, such as Olga Golodets, Vladimir Medinsky and Alexander Novak.
 Some of the candidates for the presidency of Iran in 2013 were labelled as dark horse, including Mohammad Baqer Qalibaf, Mohsen Rezai, Mostafa Pourmohammadi, Mohammad Saeedikia and Mohammad Gharazi.
 In the United Kingdom, Jeremy Corbyn, who won the 2015 Labour Party leadership election despite struggling to secure enough nominations from the Parliamentary Labour Party to stand as a candidate, has also been described as a dark horse.
 In Germany, government leaders were initially not party politicians (1867-1918). Dark horse candidates were not uncommon in the Weimar era (1919-1933); backbencher Franz von Papen and general Kurt von Schleicher were chancellors of this kind. Most influential became retired general and World War I leader Paul von Hindenburg, who was elected president in 1925, despite not even having run in the first round of that contest. In the Federal Republic (since 1949) dark horse candidates are rare. The most notable example might be Martin Schulz, former president of the European Parliament and mayor of a small town. His candidacy for chancellorship failed in the 2017 federal parliament elections, despite a temporary polling surge. In the 2021 German federal election it was long speculated that the  Green Party led by Annalena Baerbock or the CDU/CSU led by Armin Laschet would place first in the polls and/or be able to get their candidate elected chancellor. Olaf Scholz of the Social Democratic Party of Germany who had himself lost his party's leadership election to Saskia Esken and Norbert Walter-Borjans in December 2019, the winners of that contest also being described as "Dark horses", was long not considered a viable option for the chancellorship before jumping ahead to first place in the polls and ultimately leading his party to the most seats in the Bundestag.
In Venezuela, then-President of the National Assembly Juan Guaidó, almost unknown in the Venezuelan political scene, proclaimed himself acting president of the country in January 2019 and subsequently appeared in national and international media. The Washington Post called him "the accidental leader".
In Turkey, Ekrem İmamoğlu was little known before his victory in the 2019 Istanbul mayoral election.

Use in music, television, and film

In addition, surprising or unlikely nominations for such prizes as the Academy Award (awarded by the Academy of Motion Picture Arts and Sciences) are referred to as dark horses.

Guitarist and singer-songwriter George Harrison was nicknamed the "dark horse" of The Beatles, as his visibility as a songwriter and vocalist increased later in the Beatles' career, particularly on Abbey Road. Harrison went on to name his solo label Dark Horse Records and release both an album and a song titled "Dark Horse.”

Switchfoot's song "Dark Horses" was inspired by an organization called StandUp for Kids, which aids homeless and street children (the "Dark Horses") across America.

The 24th chapter of Mark Helprin's novel Winter's Tale is called 'White Horse and Dark Horse,' referring to the character of Praeger de Pinto as an outlier candidate for the Mayor of New York City.

Todd Solondz' 2011 drama film Dark Horse, whose protagonist is implied by the character's father to be "Dad's Dark Horse" in broader terms.

In 2013, a song by Katy Perry titled "Dark Horse" was featured on her fourth studio album Prism. It was the third single released from the album and topped the Billboard Hot 100 for four weeks.

Use in sport 
The term has been used in sport to describe teams and athletes who unexpectedly outperformed their expectations in a competition. Examples include the Los Angeles Kings during the 2012 Stanley Cup playoffs (who placed 1st despite being an 8th-seed entry into the playoffs; the first and only team to ever achieve such a feat), Croatia at the 2018 FIFA World Cup (who placed 2nd despite being ranked 20th in the FIFA World Rankings) and  Morocco at the 2022 FIFA World Cup (who placed 4th despite being ranked 23rd in the FIFA World Rankings).

See also
Black swan theory
Stalking horse
Underdog

References

1830s neologisms
English-language idioms
Political terminology of the United States
Political metaphors referring to people
Metaphors referring to horses
Benjamin Disraeli